German Peruvians are Peruvian citizens of full or partial German ancestry. In general, the term is also applied to descendants of other German-speaking immigrants, such as Austrians or the Swiss, or to someone who has immigrated to Peru from German-speaking countries.

History
Since independence, Germans had been immigrating to Lima on a small scale. The first wave of immigration was in 1853, organized by then-president Ramon Castilla. These immigrants established themselves in the cities of Tingo Maria, Tarapoto, Pucallpa, 
Moyobamba, and in the department of Amazonas. Baron Kuno Damian Freiherr Schutz von Holzhausen, the leader of the immigration movement, consulted with the then Peruvian Minister of Foreign Relations, Manuel Tirado. The meeting's purpose was to colonize the central jungle to better link the Pacific and Atlantic coasts. The colonists would end up colonizing Pozuzo. In 1854, the first immigration contract was signed between the Baron and then-president José Rufino Echenique. The next year, in 1855, this contract was nullified as Echenique had been ousted and Ramon Castilla had assumed the presidency again. The Baron signed a new contract with the new president on December 6, 1855. According to the contract each colonist would be reimbursed by the government for the cost of the voyage from Europe to Pozuzo, the construction of a new highway from Cerro de Pasco to Pozuzo, each colonist 15 years old or older would receive 15 pesos, the distribution of  land between the colonists of which they would have legal ownership, exemption for the first six months of taxes, and the responsibility to build schools, churches, and other basic needs. The government, however, required that the colonists be Catholic and workers skilled at a trade. To make this project possible the Baron was hired by the Peruvian government to oversee the colonization, paying him a salary of 2,400 pesos annually. The first wave of colonists departed Antwerp in 1857 and arrived in the Peruvian port of Callao two months later. The third wave of immigrants to the jungle occurred in 1868, taking the same route as the second wave of immigrants did. In later years, the descendants of the German immigrants would go on to found new cities throughout the central jungle such as Oxapampa and Villa Rica. 

Throughout the history of Peru, particularly in the 19th and 20th centuries, a substantial number of German immigrants have settled in other parts of Peru, primarily in Lima. Also, many of these German immigrants have Jewish heritage.

Education
German schools in Peru:
 Colegio Peruano-Alemán Beata Imelda
 Deutsche Schule Lima Alexander von Humboldt (Lima)
 Deutsche Schule Max Uhle Arequipa
 Reina del Mundo Schule (Colegio Peruano-Alemán Reina del Mundo)

Notable German Peruvians

Andrea Moberg
Moritz Hochschild
Liesel Holler
Federico Kauffmann
Jorge Koechlin
Maju Mantilla
Claudio Pizarro
Alberto Thieroldt
Edith Noeding

Barton Zwiebach
Juliane Koepcke
Martha Hildebrandt
Antonio Brack Egg
Isaac Mekler
Christian Meier
Guillermo Wiese de Osma
Guillermo Lohmann Villena
Gladys Zender
Francisco Sagasti
Tracy Freundt

German Peruvian institutions and associations
 Instituto Superior Tecnologico Privado Peruano
 Colegio Peruano Alemán - Alexander von Humboldt
 Colegio Waldorf Lima
 Asociación Peruano Alemán Leopoldo Krause
 Colegio Peruano Alemán "Beata Imelda"
 Instituto Cultural Peruano Aleman
 Colegio Peruano-Alemán "Max Uhle"
 Colegio Peruano Alemán Augusto Weberbauer
 Club Peruano Aleman
 CAPA - Centro de Amistad Peruano Alemán 
 Cámara de Comercio e Industria Peruano-Alemana
 Archivo de la Inmigración Alemana en el Perú
 Asociación Cultural Johannes Gutenberg
 Asociación Médica Peruana-Alemán
 Beneficencia peruano-alemana / Deutsch-peruanischer Hilfsverein 
 Centro Mallqui
 Fundación Brandt
 Humboldt Club del Perú
 Instituto Cultural Peruano Alemán de Arequipa
 Cultural Acupari
 Agro Acción Alemana / Deutsche Welthungerhilfe (DWHH)
 Comisión Brandt
 Instituto Goethe

See also
 Germany–Peru relations

Ethnic groups in Peru
European Peruvian
 
Peruvian
German diaspora in South America